Oliver John Braddick,  (16 November 1944 – 17 January 2022) was a British developmental psychologist who researched infant visual perception. He frequently collaborated with his wife Janette Atkinson.

Biography
Braddick was Emeritus Professor of Experimental Psychology at Oxford University from 2011 to 2022. Prior to that, from 2001 to 2011 he was professor and head of the Department of Experimental Psychology.

Braddick gained a BA (1965) and PhD (1968) in Experimental Psychology at Trinity College, Cambridge. Between 1968 and 1969 he was a post-doctoral fellow in the laboratory of Lorrin Riggs, Brown University, USA. In 1969 he returned to Cambridge as a University Demonstrator; later he became a lecturer and then reader. By 1976, Braddick was an active member of the Cambridge Visual Development Unit, along with Janette Atkinson, his wife. The unit carried out pioneering research on the development of visual cortical function in infancy and in early visual screening. He also advanced understanding of binocular processes of both infants and adults.

In 1993, Braddick moved to University College London, together with Janette Atkinson, as professors of Psychology. He became head of the Psychology department in 1998. In 2001, he was elected fellow of the Academy of Medical Sciences, was appointed Head of Psychology at the University of Oxford, and became a Fellow at Magdalen College, Oxford. In July 2012, Braddick was elected as a Fellow of the British Academy, for his contributions in the field of visual perception and its development in early childhood. Braddick was also a member of the Visual Development Unit at the University College of London and University of Oxford, a unit that specialises in child visual perception.

Braddick was a member of the editorial board for Current Biology. He died on 17 January 2022, at the age of 77.

Research
Braddick specialised in infant vision, particularly visual and visuomotor development of the dorsal and ventral streams in infants and children. In infancy, visual traits determine a manual response and the kinematic parameters of each type of response, including reach-and-grasp and surface exploration. These responses reflect the properties of visuo-motor modules which appear in infants from 4 to 12 months old. Because these modules are part of the dorsal cortical stream, they interact with the ventral stream processing in development and in the mature system. Braddick also researched perceptual development of infants with hyperopia.

In addition to working on infant vision, Braddick and colleagues showed that adults attempting to grab a glowing item in the dark had a longer reach duration, lower average speed, as well as lower peak speed versus the same situation in the light.

According to Braddick, reliable motion perception needs several processes that integrate and combine visual motion signals from neighbouring locations within the field of vision. This has the effect of smoothing out spatial variations in velocity.

Selected publications
Atkinson Janette, Braddick Oliver, Nardini Marko, and Anker Shirley (2007) Infant hyperopia: detection, distribution, changes and correlates-outcomes from the cambridge infant screening programs. Optom Vis Sci, 84(2):84–96.

Braddick Oliver, Birtles Deirdre, Wattam-Bell John, and Atkinson Janette (2005) Motion- and orientation-specific cortical responses in infancy. Vision Res, 45(25–26):3169-79.

Braddick Oliver, Atkinson Janette, and Wattam-Bell John (2003) Normal and anomalous development of visual motion processing: motion coherence and 'dorsal-stream vulnerability'. Neuropsychologia, 41(13):1769–84.

Mason A JS, Braddick O J, and Wattam-Bell J (2003) Motion coherence thresholds in infants—different tasks identify at least two distinct motion systems. Vision Res, 43(10):1149–57.

Braddick Oliver J, Wishart Keith A, and Curran William (2002) Directional performance in motion transparency. Vision Res, 42(10):1237–48.

Gunn Alison, Cory Elizabeth, Atkinson Janette, Braddick Oliver, Wattam-Bell John, Guzzetta Andrea, and Cioni Giovanni (2002) Dorsal and ventral stream sensitivity in normal development and hemiplegia. NeuroReport, 13(6):843-7.

Atkinson J, Anker S, Braddick O, Nokes L, Mason A, and Braddick F (2001) Visual and visuospatial development in young children with Williams syndrome. Dev Med Child Neurol, 43(5):330-7.

Braddick O J, O'Brien J M, Wattam-Bell J, Atkinson J, and Turner R (2000) Form and motion coherence activate independent, but not dorsal/ventral segregated, networks in the human brain. Curr Biol, 10(12):731-4.

Curran W, Braddick O J, Atkinson J, Wattam-Bell J, and Andrew R (1999) Development of illusory-contour perception in infants. Perception, 28(4):527-38.

References

1944 births
2022 deaths
Alumni of Trinity College, Cambridge
Alumni of University College London
British psychologists
Fellows of Magdalen College, Oxford
Fellows of the Academy of Medical Sciences (United Kingdom)
Fellows of the British Academy
Vision scientists